Diane Meyer Simon (born Diane Irene Meyer) is an environmental activist, founder and leader of Global Green USA, member of the Green Cross International's (GCI) Honorary Board, and politician.  She is from Nappanee, Indiana.  She is the former wife of Indiana real estate billionaire Herbert Simon.

Early life and education
Meyer was an only child, born in 1946 to a French father and a Swiss French mother. Her father worked as a teacher, an Air Force Pilot and medical doctor; and her mother worked as a teacher and a nurse. Simon earned B.A. in Psychology at Butler University in 1968. She went to Moscow to attend an international environment conference and met with Mikhail Gorbachev. After this conference, she became the GCI's Honorary Board. Simon also became Indianapolis's "Woman of the Year", and moved to California in 1989.

Political career
As a politician, she has worked as an administrator, political staffer for Senator Birch Bayh of Indiana, and as an organizer in the environmental field. Simon now lives in Montecito, California.

Personal life
Meyer has been married twice. Her first husband was N. Stuart Grauel, the then Deputy Secretary of State of Indiana. In 1981, Meyer married billionaire shopping mall developer Herbert Simon. They divorced in 2000. They have three children:
Sarah Elisabeth Meyer Simon is an investor who lives in New York City;
Rachel Mariam Meyer Simon Stuart is an artist and philanthropist living in Indianapolis with her husband Hale Stuart and daughter Zara; and
Asher Benjamin Meyer Simon is an artist in Los Angeles.

References

External links 
 Diane Meyer Simon official webpage

American environmentalists
American women environmentalists
Living people
American people of Swiss descent
American people of French descent
Butler University alumni
Simon family (real estate)
21st-century American women
People from Nappanee, Indiana
1946 births